Achan may refer to:
 Achan (title), a title traditionally adopted by some feudal landlords in southern India
 Achan (biblical figure), a person in the Book of Joshua
 Achan (1952 film), a 1952 Malayalam film starring Prem Nazir and B. S. Saroja
 Achan (2011 film), a 2011 Malayalam film starring Thilakan